The Expert is a 1932 American pre-Code comedy-drama directed by Archie Mayo and starring Chic Sale and Dickie Moore. It is based on a 1924 Edna Ferber and George S. Kaufman play, Minick, which is based on the short story "Old Man Minick" by Ferber. The film was produced and distributed by Warner Brothers.

The Library of Congress holds a print.

Cast
Chic Sale - Grandpa John T. Minick
Dickie Moore - Dickie
Lois Wilson - Nettie Minick
Ralf Harolde - Jim Crowley
Adrienne Dore - Sadie Crowley
Earle Foxe - Fred Minick
Noel Francis - Daisy
Elizabeth Patterson - Miss Crackenwald
Dorothea Wolbert - Annie
Charles E. Evans - Hard of Hearing Grant Resident
Louise Beavers - Lulu
Walter Catlett - Al
May Boley - Mrs. Smallbridge
Ben Holmes - Price
William Robyns - Briggs
Zita Moulton - Miss Lippencott
Elsa Peterson - Miss Stack
Adolph Leonard -

Reception
A 1932 review in TIME Magazine described the film as "a profligate adaptation of Edna Ferber's story Old Man Minick." According to a 1932 review in The New York Times, "The story of Old Man Minick's misadventures when he comes to live with his son in Chicago is told in a halting, disjointed script which seems never quite sure where it is going. By trying to tell too much of Edna Ferber's novel, the adapters have blurred the picture and made much of it unconvincing."

References

External links
 The Expert at IMDb.com
 
 

1932 films
Films directed by Archie Mayo
Warner Bros. films
Films based on short fiction
American films based on plays
American comedy-drama films
1932 comedy-drama films
Films based on works by Edna Ferber
1930s American films
1930s English-language films